Irina Spîrlea (born 26 March 1974) is a retired tennis player from Romania who turned professional in 1990. She won four singles and six doubles titles. Spîrlea reached her career-high ranking on the WTA Tour on 13 October 1997, when she became No. 7 in the world. She retired in 2000.

Personal life
Spîrlea married Massimiliano Pace, her former coach, in 2001, and has a son, Tommaso, born in 2002, as well as a younger daughter, Francesca.

Career
Irina Spîrlea is one of the more successful tennis players from Romania, being one of only three women to have reached the top 10 (the others being Virginia Ruzici and Simona Halep.) Her best performance at a Grand Slam tournament was a semifinal at the US Open in 1997. She won the WTA Newcomer of the Year award in 1994.

In 1996, Spîrlea became the first player in the history of the Women's Tennis Association to receive a match default for conduct when she swore at an official in Italian during a match played in Palermo, Italy.

Spîrlea was involved in a bumping incident with Venus Williams during a changeover in the semifinals of the 1997 US Open. Spîrlea collided with Williams near the net post while changing ends, and did not move sideways. Spîrlea went on to lose the match 6–7, 6–4, 6–7 in a third-set tiebreak, after holding two match points, at 6–4 and 6–5 in the tie breaker. Williams' father accused Spîrlea of racism, and later called her "an ugly white turkey". Spîrlea accused Williams of arrogance, saying in a press conference following the match, "I'm not going to move. She never tries to turn (...) She thinks she's the fucking Venus Williams." Spîrlea subsequently had to pay $5,000 fine for using an obscenity. At the following Grand Slam tournament, the 1998 Australian Open, Spîrlea was the first opponent of Venus' sister, Serena Williams in the main draw and lost in three sets.

WTA career finals

Singles: 10 (4 titles, 6 runner-ups)

Doubles: 13 (6 titles, 7 runner-ups)

ITF Circuit finals

Singles (3–1)

Doubles (5–8)

Singles performance timeline

Record against other top players
Spîrlea's win–loss record against certain players who have been ranked world No. 10 or higher is as follows:

Players who have been ranked world No. 1 are in boldface.

Dominique Monami 6–3
Arantxa Sánchez Vicario 5–5
Mary Joe Fernández 4–0
Karina Habšudová 4–1
Amanda Coetzer 4–4
Julie Halard-Decugis 3–2
Ai Sugiyama 3–2
Mary Pierce 3–5
Monica Seles 3–5
Barbara Schett 2–0
Brenda Schultz-McCarthy 2–0
Anna Kournikova 2–1
Sandrine Testud 2–1
Gabriela Sabatini 2–2
Chanda Rubin 2–3
Natasha Zvereva 2–5
Lori McNeil 1–0
Paola Suárez 1–0
Andrea Temesvári 1–0
Nathalie Tauziat 1–2
Serena Williams 1–3
Venus Williams 1–3
Conchita Martínez 1–4
Barbara Paulus 1–4
Lindsay Davenport 1–6
Anke Huber 1–7
Kimiko Date 0–1
Zina Garrison 0–1
Martina Navratilova 0–1
Patty Schnyder 0–1
Jennifer Capriati 0–2
Steffi Graf 0–2
Iva Majoli 0–3
Martina Hingis 0–6
Jana Novotná 0–6

References

External links
 
 
 

1974 births
Hopman Cup competitors
Living people
Tennis players from Bucharest
Romanian female tennis players
Tennis players at the 1992 Summer Olympics
Olympic tennis players of Romania
Grand Slam (tennis) champions in girls' doubles
French Open junior champions